

Events

Pre-1600
 673 – Emperor Tenmu of Japan assumes the Chrysanthemum Throne at the Palace of Kiyomihara in Asuka.
1206 – Michael IV Autoreianos is appointed Ecumenical Patriarch of Constantinople.
1600 – The Linköping Bloodbath takes place on Maundy Thursday in Linköping, Sweden: five Swedish noblemen are publicly beheaded in the aftermath of the War against Sigismund (1598–1599).

1601–1900
1602 – The Dutch East India Company is established.
1616 – Sir Walter Raleigh is freed from the Tower of London after 13 years of imprisonment.
1760 – The Great Boston Fire of 1760 destroys 349 buildings.
1815 – After escaping from Elba, Napoleon enters Paris with a regular army of 140,000 and a volunteer force of around 200,000, beginning his "Hundred Days" rule.
1848 – German revolutions of 1848–49: King Ludwig I of Bavaria abdicates.
1852 – Harriet Beecher Stowe's Uncle Tom's Cabin is published.
1854 – The Republican Party of the United States is organized in Ripon, Wisconsin, US.
1861 – An earthquake destroys Mendoza, Argentina.
1883 – The Paris Convention for the Protection of Industrial Property is signed.
1888 – The premiere of the very first Romani language operetta is staged in Moscow, Russia.
1890 – Chancellor of the German Empire Otto von Bismarck is dismissed by Emperor Wilhelm II.
1896 – With the approval of Emperor Guangxu, the Qing dynasty post office is opened, marking the beginning of a postal service in China.

1901–present
1913 – Sung Chiao-jen, a founder of the Chinese Nationalist Party, is wounded in an assassination attempt and dies 2 days later.
1916 – Albert Einstein publishes his general theory of relativity.
1921 – The Upper Silesia plebiscite was a plebiscite mandated by the Versailles Treaty to determine a section of the border between Weimar Germany and Poland.
1922 – The  is commissioned as the first United States Navy aircraft carrier.
1923 – The Arts Club of Chicago hosts the opening of Pablo Picasso's first United States showing, entitled Original Drawings by Pablo Picasso, becoming an early proponent of modern art in the United States.
1926 – Chiang Kai-shek initiates a purge of communist elements within the National Revolutionary Army in Guangzhou.
1933 – Reichsführer-SS Heinrich Himmler ordered the creation of Dachau concentration camp as Chief of Police of Munich and appointed Theodor Eicke as the camp commandant.
1942 – World War II: General Douglas MacArthur, at Terowie, South Australia, makes his famous speech regarding the fall of the Philippines, in which he says: "I came out of Bataan and I shall return".
1948 – With a Musicians Union ban lifted, the first telecasts of classical music in the United States, under Eugene Ormandy and Arturo Toscanini, are given on CBS and NBC.
1951 – Fujiyoshida, a city located in Yamanashi Prefecture, Japan, in the center of the Japanese main island of Honshū is founded.
1952 – The US Senate ratifies the Security Treaty Between the United States and Japan.
1956 – Tunisia gains independence from France.
1964 – The precursor of the European Space Agency, ESRO (European Space Research Organisation) is established per an agreement signed on June 14, 1962.
1969 – A United Arab airlines (now Egyptair) Ilyushin Il-18 crashes at Aswan international Airport, killing 100 people.
1972 – The Troubles: The first Provisional IRA car bombing in Belfast kills seven people and injures 148 others in Northern Ireland. 
1985 – Libby Riddles becomes the first woman to win the 1,135-mile Iditarod Trail Sled Dog Race.
  1985   – Canadian paraplegic athlete and humanitarian Rick Hansen begins his circumnavigation of the globe in a wheelchair in the name of spinal cord injury medical research.
1987 – The Food and Drug Administration approves the anti-AIDS drug, AZT.
1988 – Eritrean War of Independence: Having defeated the Nadew Command, the Eritrean People's Liberation Front enters the town of Afabet, victoriously concluding the Battle of Afabet.
1990 – Ferdinand Marcos's widow, Imelda Marcos, goes on trial for bribery, embezzlement, and racketeering.
1993 – The Troubles: A Provisional IRA bomb kills two children in Warrington, England. It leads to mass protests in both Britain and Ireland.
1995 – The Japanese cult Aum Shinrikyo carries out a sarin gas attack on the Tokyo subway, killing 13 and wounding over 6,200 people.
1999 – Legoland California, the first Legoland outside of Europe, opens in Carlsbad, California, US.
2000 – Jamil Abdullah Al-Amin, a former Black Panther once known as H. Rap Brown, is captured after murdering Georgia sheriff's deputy Ricky Kinchen and critically wounding Deputy Aldranon English.
2003 – Iraq War: The United States, the United Kingdom, Australia, and Poland begin an invasion of Iraq.
2006 – Over 150 Chadian soldiers are killed in eastern Chad by members of the rebel UFDC. The rebel movement sought to overthrow Chadian president Idriss Déby.
2010 – Eyjafjallajökull in Iceland begins eruptions that would last for three months, heavily disrupting air travel in Europe.
2012 – At least 52 people are killed and more than 250 injured in a wave of terror attacks across ten cities in Iraq.
2014 – Four suspected Taliban members attack the Kabul Serena Hotel, killing at least nine people.
2015 – A Solar eclipse, equinox, and a supermoon all occur on the same day.
  2015   – Syrian civil war: The Siege of Kobanî is broken by the People's Protection Units (YPG) and Free Syrian Army (FSA), marking a turning point in the Rojava–Islamist conflict.

Births

Pre-1600
43 BC – Ovid, Roman poet (d. 17)
1253 – Magadu, renamed Wareru, founder of Ramanya Kingdom, renamed Hanthawady Kingdom of Pegu (b. a commoner; d. on a Saturday in January 1307)
1319 – Laurence Hastings, 1st Earl of Pembroke (d. 1348)
1469 – Cecily of York (d. 1507)
1477 – Jerome Emser, German theologian and scholar (d. 1527)
1479 – Ippolito d'Este, Italian cardinal (d. 1520)
1502 – Pierino Belli, Italian soldier and jurist (d. 1575)
1532 – Juan de Ribera, Roman Catholic archbishop (d. 1611)

1601–1900
1612 – Anne Bradstreet, Puritan American poet (d. 1672)
1615 – Dara Shikoh, Indian prince (d. 1659)
1639 – Ivan Mazepa, Ukrainian diplomat, Hetman of Ukraine (d. 1709)
1680 – Emanuele d'Astorga, Italian composer (d. 1736)
1725 – Abdul Hamid I, Ottoman sultan (d. 1789)
1737 – Rama I, Thai king (d. 1809)
1771 – Heinrich Clauren, German author (d. 1854)
1796 – Edward Gibbon Wakefield, English politician (d. 1862)
1799 – Karl August Nicander, Swedish poet and author (d. 1839)
1800 – Braulio Carrillo Colina, Costa Rican lawyer and politician, President of Costa Rica (d. 1845)
1805 – Thomas Cooper, British poet (d. 1892)
1811 – Napoleon II, French emperor (d. 1832)
  1811   – George Caleb Bingham, American painter and politician, State Treasurer of Missouri (d. 1879)
1821 – Ned Buntline, American journalist, author, and publisher (d. 1886)
1824 – Theodor von Heuglin, German explorer and ornithologist (d. 1876)
1828 – Henrik Ibsen, Norwegian poet, playwright, and director (d. 1906)
1831 – Patrick Jennings, Northern Irish-Australian politician, 11th Premier of New South Wales (d. 1897)
  1831   – Solomon L. Spink, American lawyer and politician (d. 1881)
1834 – Charles William Eliot, American mathematician and academic (d. 1926)
1836 – Ferris Jacobs, Jr., American general, lawyer, and politician (d. 1886)
  1836   – Edward Poynter, English painter, illustrator, and curator (d. 1919)
1840 – Illarion Pryanishnikov, Russian painter (d. 1894)
1843 – Ambrosio Flores, Filipino politician (d. 1912)
1851 – Ismail Gasprinski, Crimean Tatar educator, publisher, and politician (d. 1914)
1856 – John Lavery, Irish painter (d. 1941)
  1856   – Frederick Winslow Taylor, American tennis player and engineer (d. 1915)
1870 – Paul von Lettow-Vorbeck, German general (d. 1964)
1874 – Börries von Münchhausen, German poet and activist (d. 1945)
1876 – Payne Whitney, American businessman and philanthropist (d. 1927)
1879 – Maud Menten, Canadian physician and biochemist (d. 1960)
1882 – René Coty, French lawyer and politician, 17th President of France (d. 1962)
  1882   – Harold Weber, American golfer (d. 1933)
1884 – Philipp Frank, Austrian-American physicist, mathematician, and philosopher (d. 1966)
  1884   – John Jensen, Australian public servant (d. 1970)
1885 – Vernon Ransford, Australian cricketer (d. 1958)
1888 – Amanda Clement, American baseball player, umpire, and educator (d. 1971)
1890 – Lauritz Melchior, Danish-American tenor and actor (d. 1973)
1894 – Amalie Sara Colquhoun, Australian landscape and portrait painter (d. 1974)
1895 – Fredric Wertham, German-American psychologist and author (d. 1981)
1898 – Eduard Wiiralt, Estonian artist (d. 1954) 
1900 – Amelia Chopitea Villa, Bolivia's first female physician (d. 1942)

1901–present
1903 – Edgar Buchanan, American actor (d. 1979)
1904 – B. F. Skinner, American psychologist and author (d. 1990)
1905 – Jean Galia, French rugby player and boxer (d. 1949)
1906 – Abraham Beame, American accountant and politician, 104th Mayor of New York City (d. 2001)
  1906   – Ozzie Nelson, American actor and bandleader (d. 1975)
1907 – Hugh MacLennan, Canadian author and educator (d. 1990)
1908 – Michael Redgrave, English actor and director (d. 1985)
1909 – Elisabeth Geleerd, Dutch-American psychoanalyst (d. 1969) 
1910 – Erwin Blask, German hammer thrower (d. 1999)
1911 – Alfonso García Robles, Mexican lawyer and diplomat, Nobel Prize laureate (d. 1991)
1912 – Ralph Hauenstein, American businessman and philanthropist (d. 2016)
1913 – Nikolai Stepulov, Russian-Estonian boxer (d. 1968)
1914 – Wendell Corey, American actor and politician (d. 1968)
1915 – Rudolf Kirchschläger, Austrian judge and politician, 8th President of Austria (d. 2000)
  1915   – Sviatoslav Richter, Ukrainian pianist and composer (d. 1997)
  1915   – Sister Rosetta Tharpe, American singer-songwriter and guitarist (d. 1973)
1916 – Pierre Messmer, French lieutenant and politician, Prime Minister of France (d. 2007)
1917 – Vera Lynn, English singer, songwriter and actress (d. 2020)
  1917   – Yigael Yadin, Israeli archaeologist, general, and politician, Deputy Prime Minister of Israel (d. 1984)
1918 – Jack Barry, American game show host and producer, co-founded Barry & Enright Productions (d. 1984)
  1918   – Donald Featherstone, English soldier and author (d. 2013)
  1918   – Marian McPartland, English-American pianist and composer (d. 2013)
  1918   – Bernd Alois Zimmermann, German composer (d. 1970)
1919 – Gerhard Barkhorn, German fighter ace (d. 1983)
1920 – Pamela Harriman, English-American diplomat, 58th United States Ambassador to France (d. 1997)
  1920   – Rosemary Timperley, English author and screenwriter (d. 1988)
1921 – Usmar Ismail, Indonesian filmmaker (d. 1971)
  1921   – Dušan Pirjevec, Slovenian historian and philosopher (d. 1977)
  1921   – Alfréd Rényi, Hungarian mathematician and theorist (d. 1970)
1922 – Larry Elgart, American saxophonist and bandleader (d. 2017)
  1922   – Ray Goulding, American actor and screenwriter (d. 1990)
  1922   – Carl Reiner, American actor, director, producer, and screenwriter (d. 2020)
1923 – Con Martin, Irish footballer and manager (d. 2013)
  1923   – Shaukat Siddiqui, Pakistani journalist, author, and activist (d. 2006)
1925 – John Ehrlichman, American lawyer, 12th White House Counsel (d. 1999)
1927 – John Joubert, South African-English composer and academic (d. 2019)
1928 – Jerome Biffle, American long jumper and coach (d. 2002)
  1928   – James P. Gordon, American physicist and engineer (d. 2013)
  1928   – Fred Rogers, American television host and producer (d. 2003)
1929 – William Andrew MacKay, Canadian lawyer and judge (d. 2013)
  1929   – Germán Robles, Spanish-Mexican actor and director (d. 2015)
1930 – S. Arasaratnam, Sri Lankan historian, author, and academic (d. 1998)
1931 – Dinos Christianopoulos, Greek poet (d. 2020)
  1931   – Hal Linden, American actor, singer, and director
  1931   – Rein Raamat, Estonian director and screenwriter
1933 – Lateef Adegbite, Nigerian lawyer and politician (d. 2012)
  1933   – George Altman, American baseball player
  1933   – Ian Walsh, Australian rugby league player and coach (d. 2013)
1934 – Willie Brown, American soldier, lawyer, and politician, 41st Mayor of San Francisco
  1934   – David Malouf, Australian author and playwright
1935 – Ted Bessell, American actor and director (d. 1996)
  1935   – Bettye Washington Greene, American chemist (d. 1995)
1936 – Lee "Scratch" Perry, Jamaican singer, songwriter, music producer, and inventor (d. 2021)
  1936   – Mark Saville, Baron Saville of Newdigate, English lieutenant, lawyer, and judge
1937 – Lois Lowry, American author
  1937   – Jerry Reed, American singer-songwriter, guitarist, and actor (d. 2008)
1938 – Sergei Novikov, Russian mathematician and academic, winner of the Fields Medal
1939 – Gerald Curran, American lawyer and politician (d. 2013)
  1939   – Don Edwards, American singer-songwriter and guitarist (d. 2022)
  1939   – Walter Jakob Gehring, Swiss biologist and academic (d. 2014)
  1939   – Brian Mulroney, Canadian lawyer and politician, 18th Prime Minister of Canada
1940 – Stathis Chaitas, Greek footballer and manager
  1940   – Mary Ellen Mark, American photographer and journalist (d. 2015)
  1940   – Giampiero Moretti, Italian race car driver and businessman, founded the Momo company (d. 2012)
1941 – Pat Corrales, American baseball player and manager
  1941   – Kenji Kimihara, Japanese runner
1943 – Gerard Malanga, American poet and photographer
  1943   – Douglas Tompkins, American businessman, co-founded The North Face and Esprit Holdings (d. 2015)
  1943   – Paul Junger Witt, American director and producer (d. 2018)
1944 – John Cameron, English composer and conductor
  1944   – Camille Cosby, American author, producer, and philanthropist
  1944   – Alan Harper, English-Irish archbishop
1945 – Henry Bartholomay, American soldier and pilot (d. 2015)
  1945   – Jay Ingram, Canadian television host and author
  1945   – Pat Riley, American basketball player and coach
  1945   – Tim Yeo, English politician, Shadow Secretary of State for Health
1946 – Douglas B. Green, American singer-songwriter and guitarist 
  1946   – Malcolm Simmons, English motorcycle racer (d. 2014)
1947 – John Boswell, American historian, philologist, and academic (d. 1994)
1948 – John de Lancie, American actor
  1948   – Bobby Orr, Canadian ice hockey player and coach
  1948   – Nikos Papazoglou, Greek singer-songwriter and producer (d. 2011)
1949 – Marcia Ball, American blues singer-songwriter and pianist
  1949   – Richard Dowden, English journalist and educator
1950 – William Hurt, American actor (d. 2022)
  1950   – Carl Palmer, English drummer, percussionist, and songwriter
1951 – Jimmie Vaughan, American blues-rock singer-songwriter and guitarist
1952 – Geoff Brabham, Australian race car driver
  1952   – David Greenaway, English economist and academic
1953 – Phil Judd, New Zealand singer-songwriter, guitarist and painter 
1954 – Mike Francesa, American radio talk show host and television commentator
  1954   – Liana Kanelli, Greek journalist and politician
  1954   – Paul Mirabella, American baseball player
1955 – Nina Kiriki Hoffman, American author
  1955   – Ian Moss, Australian guitarist and singer-songwriter 
  1955   – Mariya Takeuchi, Japanese singer-songwriter
1956 – Catherine Ashton, English politician, Vice-President of the European Commission
  1956   – Anne Donahue, American lawyer and politician
  1956   – Naoto Takenaka, Japanese actor, comedian, singer, and director
1957 – Vanessa Bell Calloway, American actress
  1957   – David Foster, Australian woodchopper
  1957   – Spike Lee, American actor, director, producer, and screenwriter
  1957   – Theresa Russell, American actress
  1957   – Chris Wedge, American animator, producer, screenwriter, and voice actor
1958 – Holly Hunter, American actress and producer
  1958   – Rickey Jackson, American football player
  1958   – Joe Reaiche, Australian rugby player
1959 – Dave Beasant, English footballer and coach
  1959   – Mary Roach, American author
  1959   – Sting, American wrestler
  1959   – Peter Truscott, Baron Truscott, British Labour Party politician and peer
1960 – Norm Magnusson, American painter and sculptor
  1960   – Norbert Pohlmann, German computer scientist and academic
  1960   – Yuri Shargin, Russian colonel, engineer, and astronaut
1961 – Ingrid Arndt-Brauer, German politician
  1961   – Jesper Olsen, Danish footballer and manager
  1961   – Sara Wheeler, English author and journalist
1962 – Stephen Sommers, American director, producer, and screenwriter
1963 – Paul Annacone, American tennis player and coach
  1963   – Kathy Ireland, American model, actress, and furniture designer
  1963   – Yelena Romanova, Russian runner (d. 2007)
  1963   – David Thewlis, English-French actor, director, and screenwriter
1964 – Natacha Atlas, Belgian singer-songwriter 
1965 – William Dalrymple, Scottish historian and author
1967 – Xavier Beauvois, French actor, director, and screenwriter
  1967   – Mookie Blaylock, American basketball player
1968 – Carlos Almeida, Cape Verdean runner
  1968   – A. J. Jacobs, American journalist and author
  1968   – Paul Merson, English footballer and manager
  1968   – Ultra Naté, American singer, songwriter, record producer, DJ, and promoter
  1968   – Ken Ono, Japanese-American mathematician
1969 – Yvette Cooper, English economist and politician, former Secretary of State for Work and Pensions
  1969   – Fabien Galthié, French rugby player
1970 – Edoardo Ballerini, American actor, director, producer, and screenwriter
  1970   – Josephine Medina, Filipino Paralympic table tennis player (d. 2021)
  1970   – sj Miller, American academic, public speaker, and social justice activist 
  1970   – Michael Rapaport, American actor, podcast host, and director 
1971 – Manny Alexander, Dominican baseball player
  1971   – Touré, American journalist and author
1972 – Chilly Gonzales, Canadian-German singer-songwriter, pianist, and producer
  1972   – Alex Kapranos, English-Scottish singer-songwriter, guitarist, and producer 
  1972   – Greg Searle, English rower
  1972   – Marco Sejna, German footballer
  1972   – Cristel Vahtra, Estonian skier
1973 – Nicky Boje, South African cricketer
  1973   – Natalya Khrushcheleva, Russian runner
  1973   – Talal Khalifa Aljeri, Kuwaiti businessman 
1974 – Carsten Ramelow, German footballer 
1975 – Ramin Bahrani, American director, producer, and screenwriter
  1975   – Isolde Kostner, Italian skier
1976 – Chester Bennington, American singer-songwriter, producer, and actor (d. 2017)
1978 – Kevin Betsy, English-born Seychelles international footballer and manager 
  1978   – Brent Sherwin, Australian rugby league player
1979 – Shinnosuke Abe, Japanese baseball player
  1979   – Freema Agyeman, English actress
  1979   – Keven Mealamu, New Zealand rugby player
1980 – Jamal Crawford, American basketball player
  1980   – Robertas Javtokas, Lithuanian basketball player
1981 – Ian Murray, Scottish footballer
  1981   – Carl Webb, Australian rugby league player
1982 – Terrence Duffin, Zimbabwean cricketer
  1982   – Tomasz Kuszczak, Polish footballer
  1982   – José Moreira, Portuguese footballer
1983 – Carolina Padrón, Venezuelan journalist 
  1983   – Jenni Vartiainen, Finnish singer
1984 – Vikram Banerjee, English cricketer
  1984   – Christy Carlson Romano, American actress and singer
  1984   – Fernando Torres, Spanish footballer
1985 – Morgan Amalfitano, French footballer
  1985   – Ronnie Brewer, American basketball player
  1985   – Nicolas Lombaerts, Belgian footballer
1986 – Dean Geyer, South African-Australian singer-songwriter and actor
  1986   – Julián Magallanes, Argentinian footballer
  1986   – Ruby Rose, Australian actress and model
  1986   – Román Torres, Panamanian footballer
1987 – Daniel Maa Boumsong, Cameroonian footballer
  1987   – Jô, Brazilian footballer
  1987   – Pedro Ken, Brazilian footballer
  1987   – Sergei Kostitsyn, Belarusian ice hockey player
1989 – Xavier Dolan, Canadian actor and director
  1989   – Tamim Iqbal, Bangladeshi Cricketer
1990 – Blake Ferguson, Australian rugby league player
  1990   – Marcos Rojo, Argentine footballer
1991 – Mattia Destro, Italian footballer
  1991   – Michał Kucharczyk, Polish footballer
  1991   – Ethan Lowe, Australian rugby league player
1993 – Sloane Stephens, American tennis player
1995 – Jack Bird, Australian rugby league player
1995 – Kei, South Korean singer

Deaths

Pre-1600
 687 – Cuthbert, Northumbrian (English) monk, bishop, and saint (b. 634)
 703 – Wulfram, archbishop of Sens
 842 – Alfonso II, king of Asturias (Spain) (b. 759)
 851 – Ebbo, archbishop of Reims
1181 – Taira no Kiyomori, Japanese general (b. 1118)
1191 – Pope Clement III (b. 1130)
1239 – Hermann von Salza, German knight and diplomat (b. 1179)
1302 – Ralph Walpole, Bishop of Norwich
1336 – Maurice Csák, Hungarian Dominican friar (b. 1270)
1351 – Muhammad bin Tughluq, Sultan of Delhi
1390 – Alexios III Megas Komnenos, Emperor of Trebizond (b. 1338)
1413 – Henry IV of England (b. 1367)
1440 – Sigismund I of Lithuania
1475 – Georges Chastellain, Burgundian chronicler and poet
1549 – Thomas Seymour, 1st Baron Seymour of Sudeley, English general and politician, Lord Warden of the Cinque Ports (b. 1508)
1568 – Albert, Duke of Prussia (b. 1490)

1601–1900
1619 – Matthias, Holy Roman Emperor (b. 1557)
1673 – Augustyn Kordecki, Polish monk (b. 1603)
1688 – Maria of Orange-Nassau, Dutch princess (b. 1642)
1730 – Adrienne Lecouvreur, French actress (b. 1692)
1746 – Nicolas de Largillière, French painter and academic (b. 1656)
1780 – Benjamin Truman, English brewer and businessman (b. 1699)
1793 – William Murray, 1st Earl of Mansfield, Scottish judge and politician, Attorney General for England and Wales (b. 1705)
1835 – Louis Léopold Robert, French painter (b. 1794)
1849 – James Justinian Morier, Turkish-English author and diplomat (b. 1780)
1855 – Joseph Aspdin, English businessman (b. 1788)
1865 – Yamanami Keisuke, Japanese samurai (b. 1833)
1874 – Hans Christian Lumbye, Danish composer and conductor (b. 1810)
1878 – Julius Robert von Mayer, German physician and physicist (b. 1814)
1894 – Lajos Kossuth, Hungarian lawyer, journalist and politician (b. 1802)
1897 – Apollon Maykov, Russian poet and playwright (b. 1821)
1899 – Franz Ritter von Hauer, Austrian geologist and author (b. 1822)

1901–present
1909 – Friedrich Amelung, Estonian historian and businessman (b. 1842)
1918 – Lewis A. Grant, American general and lawyer (b. 1828)
1925 – George Curzon, 1st Marquess Curzon of Kedleston, English politician, 35th Governor-General of India (b. 1859)
1929 – Ferdinand Foch, French field marshal (b. 1851)
1930 – Arthur F. Andrews, American cyclist (b. 1876)
1931 – Hermann Müller, German journalist and politician, 12th Chancellor of Germany (b. 1876)
1933 – Giuseppe Zangara, Italian-American assassin of Anton Cermak (b. 1900; executed)
1940 – Alfred Ploetz, German physician, biologist, and eugenicist (b. 1860)
1941 – Oskar Baum, Bohemian writer (b. 1883)
1945 – Dorothy Campbell, Scottish-American golfer (b. 1883)
  1945   – Maria Lacerda de Moura, Brazilian teacher and anarcha-feminist (b. 1887)
1946 – Amadeus William Grabau, American-Chinese geologist, paleontologist, and academic (b. 1870)
1947 – Sigurd Wallén, Swedish actor and director (b. 1884)
1952 – Hjalmar Väre, Finnish cyclist (b. 1892)
1958 – Adegoke Adelabu, Nigerian merchant, journalist, and politician (b. 1915)
1964 – Brendan Behan, Irish republican and playwright (b. 1923)
1965 – Daniel Frank, American long jumper (b. 1882)
1966 – Demetrios Galanis, Greek artist (b. 1879) 
  1966   – Johnny Morrison, American baseball player (b. 1895)
1968 – Carl Theodor Dreyer, Danish director and screenwriter (b. 1889)
1969 – Henri Longchambon, French politician (b. 1896)
1971 – Falih Rıfkı Atay, Turkish journalist and politician (b. 1894)
1972 – Marilyn Maxwell, American actress (b. 1921)
1974 – Chet Huntley, American journalist (b. 1911)
1977 – Charles Lyttelton, 10th Viscount Cobham, English politician, 9th Governor-General of New Zealand (b. 1909)
1977 – Terukuni Manzō, Japanese sumo wrestler, the 38th Yokozuna (b. 1919)
1978 – Jacques Brugnon, French tennis player (b. 1895)
1981 – Gerry Bertier, American football player (b. 1953)
1983 – Ivan Matveyevich Vinogradov, Russian mathematician and academic (b. 1891)
1990 – Maurice Cloche, French director, producer, and screenwriter (b. 1907)
  1990   – Lev Yashin, Russian footballer (b. 1929)
1992 – Georges Delerue, French composer (b. 1925)
1993 – Polykarp Kusch, German-American physicist and academic, Nobel Prize laureate (b. 1911)
1994 – Lewis Grizzard, American writer and humorist (b. 1946)
1997 – V. S. Pritchett, English short story writer, essayist, and critic (b. 1900)
1999 – Patrick Heron, British painter (b. 1920)
2000 – Gene Eugene, Canadian-American singer-songwriter and producer (b. 1961)
2001 – Luis Alvarado, Puerto Rican-American baseball player (b. 1949)
2004 – Juliana of the Netherlands (b. 1909)
  2004   – Pierre Sévigny, Canadian colonel and politician (b. 1917)
2005 – Armand Lohikoski, American-Finnish director and screenwriter (b. 1912)
2007 – Raynald Fréchette, Canadian lawyer, judge, and politician (b. 1933)
  2007   – Taha Yassin Ramadan, Iraqi politician, Vice President of Iraq (b. 1938)
  2007   – Hawa Yakubu, Ghanaian politician (b. 1948)
2010 – Ai, American poet and academic (b. 1947)
  2010   – Girija Prasad Koirala, Indian-Nepalese politician, 30th Prime Minister of Nepal (b. 1924)
  2010   – Stewart Udall, American soldier, lawyer, and politician, 37th United States Secretary of the Interior (b. 1920)
2011 – Johnny Pearson, English pianist, conductor, and composer (b. 1925)
2012 – Lincoln Hall, Australian mountaineer and author (b. 1955)
  2012   – Noboru Ishiguro, Japanese animator and director (b. 1938)
  2012   – Chaim Pinchas Scheinberg, Polish-Israeli rabbi and author (b. 1910)
  2012   – Jim Stynes, Irish-Australian footballer (b. 1966)
2013 – James Herbert, English author (b. 1943)
  2013   – George Lowe, New Zealand-English mountaineer and explorer (b. 1924)
  2013   – Zillur Rahman, Bangladeshi lawyer and politician, 19th President of Bangladesh (b. 1929)
2014 – Hennie Aucamp, South African poet, author, and academic (b. 1934)
  2014   – Hilderaldo Bellini, Brazilian footballer (b. 1930)
  2014   – Tonie Nathan, American politician (b. 1923)
  2014   – Khushwant Singh, Indian journalist and author (b. 1915)
2015 – Eva Burrows, Australian 13th General of The Salvation Army (b. 1929)
  2015   – Malcolm Fraser, Australian politician, 22nd Prime Minister of Australia (b. 1930)
2016 – Anker Jørgensen, Danish politician, Prime Minister of Denmark (b. 1922)
2017 – David Rockefeller, American billionaire and philanthropist (b. 1915)
2018 – C. K. Mann, a Ghanaian Highlife musician and producer (b. 1936)
2019 – Mary Warnock, English philosopher and writer (b. 1924) 
2020 – Kenny Rogers, American singer (b. 1938)

Holidays and observances
Christian feast day:
Alexandra
Blessed John of Parma
Clement of Ireland
Cuthbert of Lindisfarne 
Herbert of Derwentwater
John of Nepomuk
Józef Bilczewski
María Josefa Sancho de Guerra
Martin of Braga
Michele Carcano
Wulfram
March 20 (Eastern Orthodox liturgics)
Great American Meatout (United States)
Independence Day, celebrates the independence of Tunisia from France in 1956.
International Day of Happiness (United Nations)
International Francophonie Day (Organisation internationale de la Francophonie), and its related observances:
UN French Language Day (United Nations)
National Native HIV/AIDS Awareness Day (United States)
World Sparrow Day

References

External links

 BBC: On This Day
 
 Historical Events on March 20

Days of the year
March